Jordaniella truncatula is a rare  species of sea snail, a marine gastropod mollusk in the family Pyramidellidae, the pyrams and their allies.

Description
The length of the shell varies between 1.5 mm and 4.5 mm.

Distribution
This marine species occurs in the following locations:
 European waters (Greenland, Ireland, Atlantic France)
 United Kingdom Exclusive Economic Zone
 Atlantic Ocean off the Cape Verdes (at depths between 140 m and 200 m)

References

 Høisæter, T. (2014). The Pyramidellidae (Gastropoda, Heterobranchia) of Norway and adjacent waters. A taxonomic review. Fauna norvegica. 34: 7-78

External links
 To CLEMAM
 To Encyclopedia of Life
 To World Register of Marine Species

Pyramidellidae
Gastropods described in 1850
Molluscs of the Atlantic Ocean
Gastropods of Cape Verde